Rodolfo Antonio Moya Spuler (born July 27, 1979) is a Chilean former professional footballer who played as a forward.

In his career, Moya has played for the three biggest teams in Chile: Universidad Católica, Universidad de Chile, and Colo-Colo.

Career
At 15 years, 4 months, and 21 days, Moya made his professional debut with Chilean club Everton in Viña del Mar against Unión Española.  Moya spent four years with Everton before moving to Universidad Católica. He would go on to cap five times for Austria Vienna in 2002 before returning to Chile to play for Huachipato, La Serena, and Audax. Moya revived his career during the 2007 Chilean Apertura Tournament, while playing with Audax.

During the 2007 Copa Libertadores, Moya's play almost qualified Audax out of group play. Moya scored three goals during the Libertadores and six during the national tournament. Moya was than sold to Colo-Colo for $300,000. On August 9, 2007, Moya scored his first goal with Colo-Colo in a 3–1 win over Bolivian team Real Potosí in a Copa Sudamericana 2007 match. In July 2009 he was loaned to Everton.

Honours
Colo-Colo
 Primera División (2): 2007–C, 2008–C

References

External links

1979 births
Living people
People from Concón
Chilean footballers
Chilean expatriate footballers
Chile international footballers
Everton de Viña del Mar footballers
Club Deportivo Universidad Católica footballers
FK Austria Wien players
Universidad de Chile footballers
C.D. Huachipato footballers
Deportes La Serena footballers
Audax Italiano footballers
Colo-Colo footballers
Club Deportivo Palestino footballers
Chilean Primera División players
Primera B de Chile players
Austrian Football Bundesliga players
Chilean expatriate sportspeople in Austria
Expatriate footballers in Austria
Association football forwards